The Koehler Cultural Center is located on the campus of San Antonio College.  The Center was donated to San Antonio College and houses part of the school’s arts department.  The Center is also known as the Koehler house/mansion and is a focal point for the educational and social life of the college.  It provides a link to the living history of the area, and forms an important part of the architectural heritage of south central Texas.

The Center is located at 310 West Ashby, which at the time was considered the “outskirts” of San Antonio. In the late 19th century, the challenge from Native Americans protecting their stolen land prevented the further colonization of land to the north beyond the San Pedro area.  It wasn’t until after the defeat of the Apache resistance fighter and healer Geronimo that San Antonio settler colonialists started building in this occupied land, where Midtown and Uptown San Antonio now stand.

Otto Koehler originally built the mansion in 1901-1902, utilizing the services of Carol von Seutter as the chief architect of the mansion.  Mr. Koehler came to San Antonio in 1884 and was one of the organizers of the San Antonio Brewing Association, now known as Pearl Brewing Company.  According to legend, Koehler selected the spot due to its unobstructed view of his brewery, and could determine whether or not his employees were hard at work by the color of the smoke coming from the smokestacks.  This Victorian style mansion is a good example of the eclectic architectural style that was popular during the late 19th century and early 20th century.

See also

Recorded Texas Historic Landmarks in Bexar County

References

External links

Houses in San Antonio
History of San Antonio
Universities and colleges in San Antonio
Tourist attractions in San Antonio
Recorded Texas Historic Landmarks